Hedwig and the Angry Inch may refer to:
 Hedwig and the Angry Inch (musical), 1998
 Hedwig and the Angry Inch (soundtrack), 1999
 Hedwig and the Angry Inch (film), 2001